Bulbophyllum sect. Ephippium is a section of the genus Bulbophyllum.

Description
Characterized by a creeping rhizome usually with well separated pseudobulbs that can be greatly reduced in some cases. The individual flower stalks are slender and bear medium-sized flowers. The lateral sepals are large and often elongated in front and occasionally connate at the apex. The petals are very different. The elongated lip is often twisted. The column is subulate with a narrow foot. The section is distinguished by the fimbriated sepals and petals and the small lip (shorter than ).

Distribution
Plants from this section are found in Southeast Asia.

Species
Bulbophyllum section  Ephippium comprises the following species:

References

Orchid subgenera